Army Men: Sarge's Heroes is a third-person shooter video game developed and published by The 3DO Company for Nintendo 64, PlayStation, Dreamcast and Microsoft Windows. The player normally controls Sarge, a Sergeant in the Green Army and fights evil General Plastro and the members of the Tan Army. Both armies are named after the usual colours of toy army men.

Gameplay

Single-player
There are two modes for single player: Campaign and Boot Camp.

Campaign
Campaign is the main mode of Sarge's Heroes. The player plays as Sarge, the protagonist for many of the Army Men games. The player travels through several missions, completing objectives, killing enemies, destroying vehicles, and rescuing allied soldiers. The plot starts out as the Tan Army is invading the Green Army base. Sarge rescues Colonel Grimm and they evacuate the base in a helicopter. In the game, Sarge discovers portals that lead from the "plastic world" to the "real world". The Tan Army is getting "Weapons of Mass Destruction" from the "real world" (toys and ordinary objects, e.g. magnifying glass). Throughout the game, Sarge rescues commandos of his own unit, Bravo Company. Sometimes they are in Tan bases, and other times he has to go through portals and save them from the "real world". To avoid the destruction of the Green Army, Sarge must destroy the portals and stop Plastro.

Boot Camp
Boot Camp is a training level in which the player learns the controls. Boot Camp consists of training areas for all weapons, an obstacle course, and a "live fire course" in which Sarge is shot at.

Dreamcast Version
The Dreamcast version contains differences from the PlayStation, Nintendo 64 (the Dreamcast version is actually the N64 version with enhanced graphics, voice acting and music) and Windows versions. It was developed instead by Saffire and published by Midway. By entering the cheat "SFFRMV" in the Dreamcast version the player can view a short "Making Of" film. It also contains a plethora of extra characters such as a fluffy pink bunny, a little girl, a skeleton as well as the faces of many of the game's developers.

Multiplayer
In 2-4 player multiplayer (only 2 players in the PlayStation and PC), players choose their character, faction, and difficulty. Players then select a map. The players fight each other until the number of preset required kills to win is reached.

Reception

The Dreamcast version received "mixed" reviews according to the review aggregation website Metacritic. Chris Kramer of NextGen said of the Nintendo 64 version in its December 1999 issue, "The camera and control will probably make you throw down the controller in disgust every now and then, but if you can get past that, Army Men delivers some fun." Thirteen issues later, however, John Gaudiosi said of the former console version, "Nowhere near as fun as its nearest competitor, Toy Commander, this is the only other option for anyone looking for some miniature warfare. At best, it's worth a rental." Scary Larry of GamePro said of the latter console version in its September 1999 issue, "With a better control set, Sarge's Heroes could have been a four-star game instead of the career colonel it turns out to be. War is hell. Sarge's Heroes is heck." Eight issues later, Jake the Snake said of the PlayStation version, "In the end, Sarge's Heroes is a decent shooter that relies on a cute premise."

Notes

References

External links

1999 video games
Army Men
Dreamcast games
Multiplayer and single-player video games
Nintendo 64 games
PlayStation (console) games
Saffire games
Third-person shooters
Video games developed in the United States
Video games scored by Kevin Manthei
Windows games